Juan Huaman (born 12 June 1981) is a Peruvian long-distance runner.

In 2019, he competed in the senior men's race at the 2019 IAAF World Cross Country Championships held in Aarhus, Denmark. He finished in 120th place.

References

External links 
 

Living people
1981 births
Place of birth missing (living people)
Peruvian male long-distance runners
Peruvian male cross country runners